A cyclopentadienyl complex is a coordination complex of a metal and cyclopentadienyl groups (abbreviated as Cp−). Cyclopentadienyl ligands almost invariably bind to metals as a pentahapto (η5-) bonding mode.  The metal–cyclopentadienyl interaction is typically drawn as a single line from the metal center to the center of the Cp ring.

Examples
Biscyclopentadienyl complexes are called metallocenes. A famous example of this type of complex is ferrocene (FeCp2), which has many analogues for other metals, such as chromocene (CrCp2), cobaltocene (CoCp2), and nickelocene (NiCp2). When the Cp rings are mutually parallel the compound is known as a sandwich complex. This area of organometallic chemistry was first developed in the 1950s.  Bent metallocenes are represented by compounds of the type [MCp2Lx].  Some are catalysts for ethylene polymerization. Metallocenes are often thermally stable, and find use as catalysts in various types of reactions.

Mixed-ligand Cp complexes containing Cp ligand and one or more other ligands.  They are more numerous. One widely studied example is the Fp dimer, (Cp2Fe2(CO)4). Monometallic compounds featuring only one Cp ring are often known as half sandwich compounds or as piano stool compounds, one example being methylcyclopentadienylmanganese tricarbonyl (CpMn(CO)3).

Bonding modes
All 5 carbon atoms of a Cp ligand are bound to the metal in the vast majority of M–Cp complexes. This bonding mode is called η5-coordination. The M–Cp bonding arises from overlap of the five π molecular orbitals of the Cp ligand with the s, p, and d orbitals on the metal. These complexes are referred to as π-complexes. Almost all of the transition metals employ this coordination mode.

In relatively rare cases, Cp binds to metals via only one carbon center. These types of interactions are described as σ-complexes because they only have a σ bond between the metal and the cyclopentadienyl group. Typical examples of this type of complex are group 14 metal complexes such as CpSiMe3. An example of both is (Cp2Fe(CO)2).  It is probable that η1-Cp complexes are intermediates in the formation of η5-Cp complexes.

Still rarer, the Cp unit can bond to the metal via three carbons. In these η3-Cp complexes, the bonding resembles that in allyl ligands. Such complexes, sometimes called "slipped Cp complexes", are invoked as intermediates in ring slipping reactions.

Moreover, inverse sandwich compounds with the "metal–Cp–metal" structures are known.

Synthesis of Cp complexes
The compounds are generally prepared by salt metathesis reactions of alkali-metal cyclopentadienyl compounds with transition metal chlorides.  Sodium cyclopentadienide (NaCp) and lithium cyclopentadienide are commonly used. Trimethylsilylcyclopentadiene cyclopentadienylthallium (CpTl) are alternative sources.  For the preparation of some particularly robust complexes, e.g. nickelocene, cyclopentadiene is employed in the presence of a conventional base such as KOH. When only a single Cp ligand is installed, the other ligands typically carbonyl, halogen, alkyl, and hydride.

Most Cp complexes are prepared by substitution of preformed Cp complexes by replacement of halide, CO, and other simple ligands.

Variations of Cp complexes

Ansa Cp ligands

A pair of cyclopentadienyl ligands can be covalently linked giving rise to so-call ansa metallocenes.  The angle between the two Cp rings is fixed.  Rotation of the rings about the metal-centroid axis is stopped as well.  A related class of derivatives give rise to the constrained geometry complexes.  In these cases, a Cp ligand as linked to a non-Cp ligand.  Such complexes have been commercialized for the production of polypropylene.

Bulky Cp ligands

Pentamethylcyclopentadiene gives rise to pentamethylcyclopentadienyl (Cp*) complexes.  These ligands are more basic and more lipophilic.  Replacing methyl groups with larger substituents results in cyclopentadienes that are so encumbered that pentaalkyl derivatives are no longer possible. Well-studied ligands of this type include C5R4H− (R = iso-Pr) and 1,2,4-C5R3H2− (R = tert-Bu).

Constrained geometry complexes

Constrained geometry complexes are related to ansa-metallocenes except that one ligand is not Cp-related.

Applications
Cp metal complexes are mainly used as stoichiometric reagents in chemical research. Ferrocenium reagents are oxidants. Cobaltocene is a strong, soluble reductant.

Derivatives of Cp2TiCl2 and Cp2ZrCl2 are the basis of some reagents in organic synthesis. Upon treatment with aluminoxane, these dihalides give catalysts for olefin polymerization. Such species are called Kaminsky-type catalysts.

References

Further reading

 [Initial examples of the synthesis of Cp*-metal complexes]

Organometallic chemistry